Morya, also spelt Maurya, is one of the "Masters of the Ancient Wisdom" within modern Theosophical beliefs.  He is believed to be one of the Mahatmas who inspired the founding of the Theosophical Society and was engaged in a correspondence with two English Theosophists living in India, A. P. Sinnett and A. O. Hume.  The correspondence was published in 1923 by A. Trevor Barker, in the book The Mahatma Letters to A. P. Sinnett.

History

H. P. Blavatsky originally described the existence of a spiritual master whom she considered her guru, and who went by, among other names, Morya.  Blavatsky said that Morya and another master, Koot Hoomi, were her primary guides in establishing the Theosophical Society.  Blavatsky also wrote that Masters Morya and Koot Hoomi belonged to a group of highly developed humans known to some as the Great White Brotherhood or the White Lodge (though this is not how they described themselves).  Master Morya's personality has been depicted in some detail by various theosophical authors. A man "living on the earth, but possessed of developed senses that laughed at time and space." On the other hand, author P. Jenkins challenges that there is little evidence that Blavatsky's Masters, including Morya, ever existed.  Author K. Paul Johnson wrote that Blavatsky gave conflicting versions of her meeting with Morya and suggests Blavatsky fictionalized the story, basing it on her encounter with an Italian political activist.  Blavatsky's published works have been praised by New York papers as exhibiting immense research, in referring to her book Isis Unveiled, the New York Sun writes, "the strange part of this is, as I and many others can testify as eye witnesses to the production of the book, that the writer had no library in which to make researches and possessed no notes of investigation or reading previously done. All was written straight out of hand. And yet it is full of references to books in the British Museum and other great libraries, and every reference is correct. Either, then, we have, as to that book [referring to Isis Unveiled], a woman who was capable of storing in her memory a mass of facts, dates, numbers, titles, and subjects such as no other human being ever was capable of, or her claim to help from unseen beings is just."

After Blavatsky's death, theosophists and others continued claiming to have met Morya or to have received communications from him.  William Quan Judge, the leader of the American Section of the Theosophical Society, stated privately that he had received letters from Morya and other Adepts.  Annie Besant, head of the European Section and co-head of the Esoteric Section with Judge, made public statements supporting the genuineness of those letters; but she later accused Judge of falsifying them, asserting that her suspicions of him were confirmed by the visitation of a Mahatma, presumably Master Morya, to whom she was linked.  The ensuing controversy led to the break-up of the Society in 1895, but leaders in the increasingly fragmented movement continued making claims about having received communications and visitations from the Masters connected with the cause.  Theosophical writings offered vivid descriptions of Morya, his role in the Brotherhood, and his past lives.

Incarnations
Morya's earliest notable claimed incarnation is recorded by Annie Besant and C.W. Leadbeater (from, the source states, their research into the "akashic records" at the Theosophical Society headquarters in Adyar (Tamil Nadu), India conducted in the  summer of 1910) as having been the Emperor of Atlantis in 220,000 BC, ruling from his palace in the capital city, the City of the Golden Gates.

According to the Ascended Masters teachings, some of the later incarnations that Morya is said to have had include: 

Osho along with K.H(Devaraj)
Melchior (one of the three wise men—the one who gave myrrh to Jesus)
Abraham
King Arthur of Camelot
Thomas Becket (Archbishop of Canterbury)
Thomas More
Akbar (Mogul Emperor)
Shams Tabrizi
Thomas Moore
Sergius of Radonezh

Ascension
Students of Ascended Master Activities believe that Morya ascended in 1898, becoming an Ascended Master and Chohan of the First Ray, and that his spiritual retreat is located at Darjeeling, India.

References

Sources
 Besant, Annie and Leadbeater, C.W. Man:How, Whence, and Whither?  Adyar, India:1913—Theosophical Publishing House
 Leadbeater, C.W.  The Masters and the Path  Adyar, Madras, India: 1925—Theosophical Publishing House
 Prophet, Mark L. and Elizabeth Clare  Lords of the Seven Rays Livingston, Montana, U.S.A.:1986 - Summit University Press

Further reading
 Campbell, Bruce F. A History of the Theosophical Movement Berkeley:1980 University of California Press
 Godwin, Joscelyn. The Theosophical Enlightenment Albany, New York: 1994 State University of New York Press
 Johnson, K. Paul The Masters Revealed: Madam Blavatsky and Myth of the Great White Brotherhood Albany, New York: 1994 State University of New York Press
 Melton, J. Gordon Encyclopedia of American Religions 5th Edition New York:1996 Gale Research  ISSN 1066-1212 Chapter 18--"The Ancient Wisdom Family of Religions" Pages 151-158; see chart on page 154 listing Masters of the Ancient Wisdom; Also see Section 18, Pages 717-757 Descriptions of various Ancient Wisdom religious organizations
 Cranston, Sylvia HPB: The Extraordinary Life and Influence of Helena Blavatsky  G.P. Putnam's Sons, New York, 1993

See also
 https://en.wikiquote.org/wiki/The_Ageless_Wisdom_Teachings
 Ascended masters
 Ascended Master Teachings
Alice A.Bailey
Helena Petrovna Blavatsky
Benjamin Creme
 Hodgson Report
 Initiation (Theosophy)
Master K.H.
 K.H. Letters to C.W. Leadbeater
 Mahātmā 
Helena Roerich
 Theosophy

External links

 Theosophical Society, The originators of the  Master concept (Before the term "Ascended" was used)

Ascended Master Teachings
Masters of the Ancient Wisdom